Sumitra Bhave (12 January 1943  19 April 2021) and Sunil Sukthankar (born 31 May 1966) were an Indian filmmaker duo working predominantly in Marathi cinema and Marathi theatre. Bhave and Sukthankar had made seventeen feature films, more than fifty short films, and four TV serials; all of which had been written by Bhave. Sunil Sukthankar, a Film and Television Institute of India graduate (1989) is also an actor and a lyricist. He has written more than 90 songs for their own films as well as various other Marathi and Hindi films. The duo had won various national and international accolades for the films Doghi (1995), Dahavi Fa (2002), Vastupurush (2002), Devrai (2004), Astu (2016) and Kaasav (2017). At the 64th National Film Awards, their feature film Kaasav won the prestigious President Golden Lotus National Award.

Personal life

Sumitra Bhave 
Bhave was born on 12 January 1943 in Pune. She completed her graduation from Fergusson College, Pune, and received a master's degree in Political and Science Sociology from Pune University. She received another master's degree in Political Science and Sociology and a Diploma in Rural Welfare from the Tata Institute of Social Sciences, Mumbai, and later began her voluntary work for various organisations. She taught at the Karve Institute of Social Service, Pune, for a decade and later worked as a Project Manager for Community Aid and Sponsorship Program, Mumbai. Bhave has published various investigation and research papers on the subject. She worked as a Marathi language newsreader with All India Radio, New Delhi.

Bhave had a daughter, who is also a writer. On 6 April 2021, Bhave was admitted to Sahyadri Hospital in Pune for lung infection. She was suffering from Interstitial lung disease which was detected earlier in March 2021. She died on the morning of 19 April 2021 due to respiratory failure and lung fibrosis. At the time of her death, she was working on three films and their scripts.

Sunil Sukthankar 
Sukthankar was born on 31 May 1966 in Karad. He completed his graduation in Commerce from Brihan Maharashtra College of Commerce, Pune and joined the Film and Television Institute of India to pursue a course in film direction. His diploma film was titled Anuttar. As a theatre activist, Sukthankar wrote and directed several plays and street plays.

Career 
In 1985, while working as the Director of Research Project for Stree Vani, Bhave made a debut short film Bai (Woman) about a woman from the slums to display her strength to survive adversities. The film, produced by Stree Vani, was well received and went on to win the National Film Award for Best Non-Feature Film on Family Welfare at the 33rd National Film Awards. It was honoured for "its realistic portrayal of poor, oppressed housewife who succeeds in her determined effort to rehabilitate herself and realise her potential to be on her own". Her next short film Paani, made in 1987, also fetched her another National Film Award. The film was adjudged the Best Educational / Motivational / Instructional Film at the 35th National Film Awards. Bhave later made several other short films like Mukti (1990), Chakori (1992), Laha (1994), and Three Faces of Tomorrow. Bhave has received a Chitra Ratna Puraskar and Kamdhenu Award for literary contribution.

After a career as a theatre activist, Sukthankar was introduced to Bhave through her daughter while she was making her debut short film Bai (1985). After completing his graduation and film direction course from the Film and Television Institute of India, he joined Bhave again as an assistant and worked on three short films.

Collaboration

1995—2009 
In 1995, Bhave collaborated with Sukthankar as a director and made their film debut with a Marathi film Doghi (Two Sisters). The film depicts a story about two sisters and their mother caught in rigid and superstitious social structure. The film received wide critical acclaim and won several awards including the Best Film at the 32nd Maharashtra State Film Awards and the Best Film on Other Social Issues at the 43rd National Film Awards. Their next film Zindagi Zindabad (Long live, Life!) was made in Hindi in 1997. The film was based on a real-life story of a teenager who risked his own life to care for a person stigmatised by HIV/AIDS. In 2002, two of the films made by Bhave and Sukthankar, both made in Marathi, Dahavi Fa (10th F) and Vastupurush (Guardian Spirit of the House), were released. The filmmaker duo initially approached the Children's Film Society to produce Dahavi Fa but the organization refused the script for not fitting "into their 'objectives'". The film was finally funded by their friends and was released under the duo's production company "Vichitra Nirmiti". Both films received wide critical acclaim; Vastupurush was awarded the Best Feature Film in Marathi at the 50th National Film Awards, Dahavi Fa was adjudged the Best Film at the 40th Maharashtra State Film Awards, and the duo won the Best Director award. The duo considers Vastupurush as their "important and favourite film".

In 2004, Bhave—Sukthankar made their next Marathi film Devrai (Sacred Grove) on the subject of schizophrenia with Atul Kulkarni and Sonali Kulkarni playing the lead roles. The film was appreciated for its depiction of schizophrenia and performances of its leads, and won several awards upon its release including the Best Film on Environment Conservation / Preservation at the 52nd National Film Awards, Best Film, Best Director, Best Actor, and Best Actress award at the 11th Screen Awards Marathi and the Award for Best Film with Social Message at the 42nd Maharashtra State Film Awards. In 2006, two of Bhave—Sukthankar's Marathi films were released; Badha (Possessed) and Nital (Crystal Clear). While Badha depicts a story of a woman from the shepherd community battling depression due to the "shamans, stigma and superstition" in their community, Nital focuses on the stigma associated with the disease vitiligo in Indian society. Nital was adjudged the Best Film at the 44th Maharashtra State Film Awards, and the duo won the Best Director award.

In 2007, Bhave—Sukthankar made a short film in Hindi, Bewaqt Barish (Untimely Rain), financed by the European Union and produced by Muktangan Mitra. The film focuses on the issues around HIV/AIDS, sex and sexuality and is based on the Oxford Committee for Famine Relief's work with rural and tribal community in the Rajasthan and Odisha states of India. Two of the duo's Marathi films were released in 2009; Ek Cup Chya (A Cup of Tea) and Gho Mala Asla Hava (This is the Husband I Want). Ek Cup Chya depicts a story of a common man who challenges the Government authorities using the Right to Information Act, 2005, an act of the Parliament of India that gives its citizens the right to access government records. The film was awarded the Third Best Film at the 2009	Maharashtra State Film Awards and Bhave—Sukthankar won the Best Director award. Gho Mala Asla Hava premiered at the Pune International Film Festival and is a comical representation of marital problems. Bhave had initially had plans to make it as a short film. The film marked the debut of actress Radhika Apte, who had previously acted for the theatre.

2010—2021 

In 2010, the duo made the Hindi language feature-cum-documentary film Mor Dekhne Jungle Mein (To Look for a Peacock in the Jungle). The film was produced by the BAIF Development Research Foundation and was inspired by their "Wadi" project. It focuses on urban youth involvement in rural development and rehabilitation of tribal families. Bhave—Sukthankar's 2011 Marathi film Ha Bharat Majha (This is My India) depicts the contrast in the Indian society who support the 2011 Indian anti-corruption movement started by activist Anna Hazare but continue to practice small corrupt acts in their daily lives. The film was awarded the Best Marathi Film at the 10th Pune International Film Festival. The duo made a Marathi film in 2013, Samhita (The Script). The film received positive reviews for its story, direction, music, and performances. It received two awards at the 60th National Film Awards, and Bhave was awarded for the Best Screenplay at the 11th Pune International Film Festival. Their next Marathi film, Astu (So Be It), dealt with the subject of Alzheimer's, and is about a Sanskrit scholar who is suffering from it. The film was appreciated for its depiction of the disease and performances of its leads, and won several awards. Bhave won Best Dialogue at the 61st National Film Awards. Though the film was completed in 2013, it did not find any distributor and was released through crowdfunding in 2016.

In 2015, the duo made a short film in Hindi, Phir Zindagi (Life Again) which deals with topic of organ donation. Their upcoming Marathi film Kaasav depicts the issue of depression among youngsters in relation to the life and nesting cycle of olive ridley sea turtles. The film was awarded the Best Feature Film at the 64th National Film Awards. Kaasav (Turtle) became the fifth Marathi film to win in this category. The film was also awarded the Best Film at the 55th Maharashtra State Film Awards.

In 2019, Bhave's next film Dithee premiered at the Pune International Film Festival. Bhave had been working on this film since many years but the project could not start due to lack of producers. Bhave lended her voice to the character of Sindhubai Jadhav in the 2020 film The Disciple directed by Chaitanya Tamhane. The film is about a young aspiring classical singer and Jadhav is a veteran singer of yester-years whose only audio recordings are now available.

Filmography

Short films and TV serials

Feature films

Awards

Notes

References

Awards

External links 
 
 

Film directors from Maharashtra
Indian women screenwriters
Marathi film directors
Indian filmmaking duos
20th-century Indian film directors
21st-century Indian film directors
20th-century Indian women artists
21st-century Indian women artists
Women artists from Maharashtra
Best Dialogue National Film Award winners
Producers who won the Best Feature Film National Film Award
Directors who won the Best Feature Film National Film Award
Directors who won the Best Film on Environment Conservation/Preservation National Film Award
Directors who won the Best Film on Other Social Issues National Film Award